Robert Peter George (born July 10, 1955) is an American legal scholar, political philosopher, and public intellectual who serves as the sixth McCormick Professor of Jurisprudence and Director of the James Madison Program in American Ideals and Institutions at Princeton University. He lectures on constitutional interpretation, civil liberties, philosophy of law, and political philosophy. A Catholic, George is considered one of the country's leading conservative intellectuals.

In addition to his professorship at Princeton, he is the Herbert W. Vaughan senior fellow at the Witherspoon Institute, a senior fellow of the American Enterprise Institute, and the Ronald Reagan Honorary Distinguished Professor of Public Policy and Nootbaar Honorary Distinguished Professor of Law at Pepperdine University. He has frequently been a visiting professor at Harvard Law School.

Early life and education
George was born on July 10, 1955, and is of Syrian and Italian descent. The grandson of immigrant coal miners, he grew up in Morgantown, West Virginia. George received a Bachelor of Arts from Swarthmore College, a Juris Doctor from Harvard Law School, a Master of Theological Studies from Harvard Divinity School, and a Doctor of Philosophy from Oxford University. As a doctoral student at Oxford, he studied the philosophy of law under the supervision of John Finnis and Joseph Raz and served as a lecturer in jurisprudence in New College. Since the completion of his DPhil, the University of Oxford has presented George with two earned higher doctorates, a DCL and a DLitt.

Academic career

George joined the faculty of Princeton University as an instructor in 1985, and in the following year, he became a tenure-track assistant professor. He spent 1988–89 on sabbatical leave as a visiting fellow in law at Oxford University, working on his book Making Men Moral: Civil Liberties and Public Morality. George was promoted to associate professor with tenure at Princeton in 1994 and to professor in 1999, being named to Princeton's McCormick Chair of Jurisprudence, an endowed professorship previously held by Woodrow Wilson, Edward S. Corwin, William F. Willoughby, and Walter F. Murphy. George founded Princeton's James Madison Program in American Ideals and Institutions in 2000 and serves as its director. While George describes the program as not ideological, articles in the media have described it as a program that fosters conservative ideals.

Cornel West 
George has been a frequent conversation partner with Cornel West, a leading left-wing public intellectual, and the two are considered close friends. The two have appeared together at colleges and universities around the country, arguing for civil dialogue and a broad conception of campus freedom of speech as essential to the truth-seeking mission of academic institutions. In March 2017, they jointly published the statement "Truth-Seeking, Democracy, and Freedom of Thought and Expression," in response to what they described as "campus illiberalism," stemming from an incident where an invited speaker and his faculty conversation partner at Middlebury College was shouted down and physically attacked; the letter was picked up by national media.

Political activity

George twice served as Governor of the West Virginia Democratic Youth Conference, and attended the 1976 Democratic National Convention as an alternate delegate. He moved to the right in the 1980s, largely due to his views on abortion, and left the Democratic Party as a result of what he saw as its increasingly strong commitment to legal abortion and its public funding, and his growing skepticism about the effectiveness of large scale government-run social welfare projects in Appalachia and other low income rural and urban areas.

In 2009, George founded the American Principles Project, which aims to create a grass-roots movement around his ideas. He is a past chairman of the National Organization for Marriage, an advocacy group opposed to same-sex marriage, and co-founder of the Renewal Forum, an organization fighting the sexual trafficking and commercial exploitation of women and children.

George was one of the drafters of the 2009 Manhattan Declaration, a manifesto signed by Orthodox, Catholic and Evangelical leaders that "promised resistance to the point of civil disobedience against any legislation that might implicate their churches or charities in abortion, embryo-destructive research or same-sex marriage." He has also joined with Muslim scholar Shaykh Hamza Yusuf in urging hotel chains and other businesses to refrain from offering or promoting pornography. He has worked closely with his former student Rabbi Meir Soloveichik and with the late Rabbi Lord Jonathan Sacks of Great Britain to combat anti-Semitism in Europe. Along with other public intellectuals, George played a key role in creating the "theoconservative" movement and integrating it into mainstream Republicanism. Much of George's work on religious liberty has centered on the idea that religion is a "distinct human good", which he asserts allows people to "live authentically by ordering one's life in line with one's best judgments of conscience."

George was threatened with death by abortion rights extremist Theodore Shulman, who also targeted Priests for Life director Rev. Frank Pavone, saying that they would be killed if the accused killer of Dr. George Tiller (a Wichita abortion-provider) was acquitted. For his crimes, Shulman was sentenced by Federal Judge Paul A. Crotty to 41 months' imprisonment and 3 years' supervised release.

George endorsed Texas Senator Ted Cruz in the 2016 Republican presidential primaries. In his own words, he "fiercely opposed" the candidacy of Donald Trump, saying that he was "a person of poor character." In July 2017, after Trump had become president, George praised his nomination of Neil Gorsuch to the Supreme Court. However, he characterized his attempts to restrict immigration to the United States from certain countries as "unnecessary and therefore unjust." He went on to say, "One thing you have to say for President Trump is that he has been fortunate in his enemies. Although he gives them plenty to legitimately criticize him about, they always go overboard and thus discredit themselves with the very people who elected Mr. Trump and may well re-elect him."

Other professional and public service activities

George served from 1993–1998 as a presidential appointee to the United States Commission on Civil Rights, and from 2002–2009 as a member of the President's Council on Bioethics. George was appointed to the U.S. Commission on International Religious Freedom by the Speaker of the U.S. House of Representatives in 2012, and in the following year was elected Chairman of the Commission. He served until hitting the statutory term limit in 2016.

He is a former Judicial Fellow at the Supreme Court of the United States, receiving during his tenure there the Justice Tom C. Clark Award. He has served as the U.S. member of UNESCO's World Commission on the Ethics of Scientific Knowledge and Technology (COMEST), of which he remains a corresponding member. He is a member of the boards of the Ethics and Public Policy Center (where he is Vice-Chairman of the Board), the American Enterprise Institute, the Becket Fund for Religious Liberty, the National Center on Sexual Exploitation, the Center for Individual Rights, the Heritage Foundation, the Lynde and Harry Bradley Foundation, and the Templeton Foundation Religion Trust.

He is Of Counsel to the law firm Robinson & McElwee and is a member of the Council on Foreign Relations.

George is a contributor to Touchstone Magazine, of which he is also a senior editor.

Reception
In 2009, George was called the "most influential conservative Christian thinker" in the United States by David Kirkpatrick of the New York Times. Kirkpatrick goes on to state:

Supreme Court Justice and former Harvard Law School Dean Elena Kagan has praised George as "one of the nation's most respected legal theorists," saying that the respect he had gained was due to "his sheer brilliance, the analytic power of his arguments, the range of his knowledge," and "a deeply principled conviction, a profound and enduring integrity."

In announcing his election as Chairman of the U.S. Commission on International Religious Freedom in 2013, outgoing Chairwoman Katrina Lantos Swett, a Democrat appointed by Senate Majority Leader Harry Reid, praised George as "a true human rights champion whose compassion for victims of oppression and wisdom about international religious freedom shine through all we have accomplished." George was described by The New Yorker in 2014 as "a widely respected conservative legal philosopher" who has "played [intellectual] godfather to right-leaning students on [the Princeton] campus."

George's critics, including many Catholic scholars, have argued that he has neglected critical aspects of the Christian message, including "the corruption of human reason through original sin, the need for forgiveness and charity and the chance for redemption," focusing instead on "mechanics" of morality, and – through his political associations and activism – turned the church "into a tool of Republican Party."

Honors
On December 8, 2008, George was awarded the Presidential Citizens Medal by President George W. Bush in a ceremony in the Oval Office of the White House. His other awards include the Honorific Medal for the Defense of Human Rights of the Republic of Poland, the Canterbury Medal of the Becket Fund for Religious Liberty, the Philip Merrill Award of the American Council of Trustees and Alumni, the Irving Kristol Award of the American Enterprise Institute, the Sidney Hook Award of the National Association of Scholars, the Paul Bator Award of the Federalist Society for Law and Public Policy, and Princeton University's President's Award for Distinguished Teaching. He holds twenty-two honorary degrees, including a Doctor Honoris Causa awarded by the Universitat Abat Oliba CEU University in Barcelona, Spain in 2017. Also in 2017, Baylor University launched the "Robert P. George Initiative in Faith, Ethics, and Public Policy," as part of its Baylor in Washington, D.C. program. In 2020, the Initiative became a joint project of the University of Dallas and the American Enterprise Institute.

Musical activity
George is a finger-style guitarist and bluegrass banjo player. His guitar playing is in the style of Chet Atkins and Jerry Reed. His banjo playing has been influenced by Earl Scruggs, Don Reno, and Bela Fleck. As a teenager, he performed with folk groups and bluegrass bands in coffee houses, clubs, and state fairs, and at Swarthmore, he led the band "Robby George and Friends."

Works

Books
 Natural Law Theory: Contemporary Essays, 1992. 
 Making Men Moral, 1995. 
 Natural Law and Moral Inquiry: Ethics, Metaphysics, and Politics in the Work of Germain Grisez, 1998. 
 In Defense of Natural Law, 1999. 
 The Autonomy of Law: Essays on Legal Positivism, 1999. 
 Natural Law and Public Reason, 2000. 
 Great Cases in Constitutional Law, 2000. 
 The Clash of Orthodoxies, 2001. 
 Natural Law, Liberalism, and Morality, 2001. 
 Constitutional Politics: Essays on Constitution Making, Maintenance, and Change, 2001 
 The Meaning of Marriage: Family, State, Market, And Morals, 2006 
 Body-Self Dualism in Contemporary Ethics and Politics, 2007 
 Embryo: A Defense of Human Life, 2008 
 Moral Pública: Debates Actuales, 2009 
 What Is Marriage? Man and Woman: A Defense, 2012 
 Conscience and Its Enemies: Confronting the Dogmas of Liberal Secularism, 2013 
Mind, Heart, and Soul: Intellectuals and the Path to Rome (with R.J. Snell), 2018

References

External links

 Full text of "Reauthorization of the U.S. Commission on Civil Rights: hearing..."
 The Conservative–Christian Big Thinker, New York Times, Dec. 16, 2009
 "Online Resources," collected by RatzingerFanClub.com; lists links to articles, addresses and interviews, book reviews, etc.
 
 Articles in Touchstone magazine
 Robert P. George's Robinson & McElwee profile
 encyclopedia.com entry

1955 births
Alliance Defending Freedom people
Alumni of New College, Oxford
American lawyers
American people of Syrian descent
American people of Italian descent
American philosophers
Catholic philosophers
Catholics from West Virginia
Federalist Society members
Harvard Divinity School alumni
Harvard Law School alumni
Living people
National Organization for Marriage people
New Jersey Republicans
Lawyers from Morgantown, West Virginia
Philosophers from West Virginia
Philosophers of law
Presidential Citizens Medal recipients
Princeton University faculty
Swarthmore College alumni
Thomists
West Virginia Democrats
Witherspoon Institute